Kværner was a Norwegian engineering and construction services company that existed between 1853 and 2005.  In 2004, it was amalgamated to the newly formed subsidiary of Aker ASA - Aker Kværner, which was renamed Aker Solutions on 3 April 2008.  Kværner re-emerged on 6 May 2011, when the EPC (engineering, procurement and construction) part of Aker Solutions took the Kværner name.  The new Kværner company was listed on the Oslo Stock Exchange on 8 July 2011.

History
Kvaerner Brug was founded in Oslo in 1853 by industrialist Oluf A. Onsum  (1820-1899). The company became principally involved in the production of cast iron stoves. In 1870, Kvaerner built its first hydroelectric turbine.
During the early 1900s, Kvaerner power turbines remained the principal product line which also included bridges, cranes, and pumps. Kvaerner was listed on the Oslo Stock Exchange in 1967. By the 1990s, the company assembled a collection of engineering and industrial businesses, including shipbuilding, construction of offshore oil and gas platforms, production of pulping and paper manufacturing equipment, and operation of shipping fleet.

Directors-general of Kværner after the stock exchange listing were Kjell B. Langballe (1960–1976), Carl Røtjer (1976–1986) and Mikal H. Grønner (1986–1989). Chairmen were Frithjof A. Lind (–1982), Johan B. Holte (1982–1985), Emil Eriksrud (1985–1986), Carl Røtjer (1986–1989), Kaspar Kielland (1989-1996), and then Christian Bjelland (1996-2001). Since 2011, the CEO has been Jan Arve Haugan.

Erik Tønseth became director-general of Kværner in 1989, and under his leadership the company underwent large-scale international expansion, acquiring the state-owned Govan Shipbuilders from British Shipbuilders. In 1992 Kværner acquired the Swedish company Götaverken. In 1996, Kværner acquired the UK conglomerate Trafalgar House, and moved its international headquarters from Oslo to London. In January 1996, Kvaerner purchased a stake in the Vyborg Shipyard and renamed it Kverner-Vyborg Shipyard which was the largest manufacturer of offshore installations in Russia.

The company's expansive acquisitions brought economic hardship to the company. Kjell Almskog became CEO in 1998, and implemented various plans to streamline the company. This included the sale of the Cunard Line (a division of Trafalgar House) to Carnival Corporation, the sale of Kvaerner Govan to BAE Systems and the sale of Chemrec to Babcock Borsig. On 10 March 2000, Kvaerner sold the Vyborg Shipyard, which was losing money and faced closure during 1999, to the Sergey Zavyalov associated early 1990s established Ako Barss Group which sold the shipyard to Rossiya Bank owners who placed the shipyard in the United Shipbuilding Corporation (USC) in 2012. In August 2000, Kværner sold its Construction Division to the Swedish company Skanska.

The economic slowdown in 2001 coupled with the heavy debt burden and a series of management missteps brought the company to the brink of bankruptcy. Hugo Erikssen, a director of public relations at Yukos, and Oleg Sheiko, Yukos' vice president for finance, and Alexey Golubovich, who was Yukos' "director of corporate finance" until 2001, supported Kværner with mergers and financing.

In November 2001, Kværner was forced to merge with its rival Aker ASA, a Norwegian oil services group controlled by Kjell Inge Røkke. Røkke scuppered the solution preferred by Kværner's management, a rescue by Russia's oil giant Yukos. Kværner's international headquarters returned to Oslo and Kværner was restructured to become a holding company, with operating activities concentrated in Aker Kværner and Aker Yards. As of 2005 Kværner ASA was merged with Aker Maritime Finance AS, a wholly owned company of Aker ASA and the Kværner corporation ceased to exist.

In 2008, Aker Kvaerner changed its name to Aker Solutions ASA. In December 2010, Aker Solutions announced a decision to cultivate its core businesses. Kvaerner was established, through a demerger, as a specialised EPC (engineering, procurement and construction) company addressing the global market. On 6 May 2011, the shareholders' annual general meeting approved the establishing of Kvaerner as a separate company.

In September 2019 the company announced their plans to target renewable growth and they are looking to expand their operations in renewable energy to help boost this growth by around 40% in the coming years.

Notes

References

External links
Kvaerner website 

 
Shipbuilding companies of Norway
Engineering companies of Norway
Oil companies of Norway
Shipping companies of Norway
Aker ASA
Conglomerate companies of Norway
Defunct companies of Norway
Defunct manufacturing companies of Norway
Companies based in Oslo
Manufacturing companies established in 1853
Non-renewable resource companies established in 1853
Transport companies established in 1853
Companies established in 1853
Companies disestablished in 2011
Manufacturing companies disestablished in 2011
Non-renewable resource companies disestablished in 2011
1853 establishments in Norway
2011 disestablishments in Norway
Companies formerly listed on the Oslo Stock Exchange